Introducing Foxy Shazam is the second studio album by the American rock band Foxy Shazam. It was released on January 22, 2008, by Ferret Music and New Weatherman. In spite of the name, Introducing was not the first album the band created. Recording for the album began at a Seattle studio in August 2007. The band joined Piermont Management, which is partially owned by Jesse Korman (frontman of The Number Twelve Looks Like You), to produce it along with Casey Bates. The vinyl comes in two editions. A vinyl colored red and orange was printed with a limited 300 copies and the other 700 records are clear vinyl with a rainbow splatter design.

Personnel
Eric Sean Nally - vocals
Loren Daniel Turner - guitars
Sky Vaughn White - keyboards
Daisy - bass guitar
Joseph Allen Halberstadt - drums

Track listing
All songs written and composed by Foxy Shazam.
"Introducing Foxy" - 3:18
"The Rocketeer" - 2:49
"A Dangerous Man" - 3:06
"The Science of Love" - 3:04
"A Black Man's Breakfast" - 3:30
"It's Hair Smelled Like Bonfire" - 2:41
"Red Cape Diver" - 4:17
"Yes! Yes! Yes!" - 2:55
"Ghost Animals" - 3:28
"Cool" - 4:12

B-sides
"Born to the Devil" - 3:06 (Japanese bonus track)
"Sky in a Room" - 2:12 (Japanese bonus track)

References

2008 albums
Foxy Shazam albums
Ferret Music albums